Nemonapride (エミレース, Emilace (JP)) is an atypical antipsychotic approved in Japan for the treatment of schizophrenia. It was launched by Yamanouchi in May 1991. Nemonapride acts as a D2 and D3 receptor antagonist, and is also a potent 5-HT1A receptor agonist. It has affinity for sigma receptors.

See also 
 Benzamide

References 

Atypical antipsychotics
Benzamides
Chloroarenes
Phenol ethers
Pyrrolidines